The Polish Open (sponsored by BNP Paribas) was a tennis tournament held in Sopot, Poland in 2011. In 2018, a new ATP Challenger Tour tournament named Sopot Open will be held in Gdynia.

Past finals

Singles

Doubles

References

External links
Official website

ATP Challenger Tour
Tennis tournaments in Poland
Clay court tennis tournaments
Sport in Sopot